The Grand Prix Criquielion is a European single day cycle race held each year in and around the Belgian village of Deux-Acren. The race was first organized in 1991 in honour of Claude Criquielion, who had announced his retirement that same year and was also the first winner of the race. The race was organized as a 1.2 category event on the UCI Europe Tour until 2023 when it upgraded to 1.1 status.

Winners

References

External links

Cycle races in Belgium
UCI Europe Tour races
Recurring sporting events established in 1991
1991 establishments in Belgium